Jens Otto Larsen (5 April 1893 - 23 July 1969) was a Danish amateur football player with Frem, Fremad Amager and the Danish national team. Larsen was known as a very talented but somewhat inconsistent player. He was part of the Frem team that won the first ever Danish Championship to the club in 1923.

Honours
Danish Championship: 1922-23 with Frem

References

External links
Danish national team profile

1893 births
1969 deaths
Danish men's footballers
Denmark international footballers
Boldklubben Frem players
Association football midfielders
Fremad Amager players
People from Rudersdal Municipality
Sportspeople from the Capital Region of Denmark